Kabeliai is a village in Varėna district municipality, in Alytus County, in southeastern Lithuania. According to the 2011 census, the village has a population of 168 people.

According to the 1921 census, the village was inhabited by 258 people, among whom 240 were Roman Catholic, 4 Orthodox, and 14 Mosaic. At the same time, 8 inhabitants declared Polish nationality, 1 Belarusian, 14 Jewish and 235 Lithuanian. There were 44 residential buildings in the village.

In the years 1921-1945 the village was within the borders of Poland.

Kabeliai village is located c.  from Druskininkai,  from Marcinkonys,  from Ašašninkai (the nearest settlement),  from the Belarusian border.

References

Villages in Alytus County
Varėna District Municipality